Jason Holland may refer to:
 Jason Holland (ice hockey), Canadian-German ice hockey player
 Jason Holland (rugby union) New Zealand rugby union player
 Jason Michael Holland, English designer
 Jason Holland (prisoner), convicted of killing Jimmy Farris in 1995